
Gmina Złocieniec is an urban-rural gmina (administrative district) in Drawsko County, West Pomeranian Voivodeship, in north-western Poland.

The gmina contains part of the protected area called Drawsko Landscape Park.

Villages
Apart from the town of Złocieniec, Gmina Złocieniec contains the villages and settlements of Błędno, Bobrowo, Cieszyno, Darskowo, Jadwiżyn, Jarosław, Kosobudki, Kosobudy, Lubieszewo, Małobór, Męcidół, Rzęśnica, Skąpe, Stare Worowo, Stawno, Sułoszyn, Szymalów, Uraz, Warniłęg, Wąsosz and Zatonie.

Neighbouring gminas
Gmina Złocieniec is bordered by the gminas of Czaplinek, Drawsko Pomorskie, Kalisz Pomorski, Ostrowice, Połczyn-Zdrój and Wierzchowo.

References
Polish official population figures 2006

Zlocieniec
Drawsko County